This is a highly incomprehensive list of hiking trails in the U.S. state of Wisconsin. The list does not include many smaller trails that are found in places such as Wisconsin state parks, and it includes multi-purpose biking trails that also function as hiking trails.

Federally administered trails
Ice Age Trail (under construction),  
North Country Trail (under construction), .  completed in northern Wisconsin.

State operated trails

400 State Trail,  between Elroy and Reedsburg
Badger State Trail between Madison and Freeport (website)
Bearskin State Trail,  between Minocqua and Tomahawk (website)
Buffalo River State Trail,  between Mondovi and Fairchild
Chippewa River State Trail,  between Eau Claire and the Red Cedar Trail (website)
Elroy-Sparta State Trail,  between Elroy and Sparta (website)
Glacial Drumlin State Trail,  between Waukesha and Cottage Grove (website)
Great River State Trail,  between Onalaska and Trempealeau
Hank Aaron State Trail,  within Milwaukee(website)
La Crosse River State Trail,  between Sparta and La Crosse (website)
Military Ridge State Trail,  between Madison and Dodgeville (website)
Red Cedar State Trail,  from Menomonie to the Chippewa River Trail
Sugar River State Trail,  from New Glarus and Brodhead; (website)
Tuscobia State Trail,  from Rice Lake to Park Falls (website)

County operated trails

Ahnapee State Trail,  between Sturgeon Bay to Algoma and Casco; operated by Door County and Kewaunee County (website)
BATS-Crystal Lake Trail,  between Boulder Junction to Crystal Lake; operated by Vilas County (website)
Bannerman Trail, 7 miles between Bannerman and Redgranite; operated by Waushara County
Capital City State Trail,  along Lake Monona
Cattail State Trail,  in Western Wisconsin;  operated by Barron County
Cheese Country Trail,  from Monroe to Mineral Point; operated by Lafayette, Iowa and Green Counties (website)
Devil's River State Trail,  between Denmark and Rockwood
Duck Creek Trail,  between Seymour and the Village of Oneida.
Eisenbahn State Trail,  from Eden to West Bend
Fox River State Recreational Trail,  between Green Bay and Greenleaf; Extending south to Hilbert in Calumet County in 2010 ; operated by Brown County (website
Friendship State Trail between Brillion and Forest Junction; operated by Calumet County
Gandy Dancer State Trail,  between St. Croix Falls and Superior; operated by Polk County, Douglas County and Burnett County
Great Sauk State Trail,  between Sauk Prairie and Sauk Prairie State Recreation Area
Hillsboro State Trail,  between Hillsboro and the 400 State Trail; operated by Vernon County and Juneau County
Kenosha County Bike Trail, from the southern to the northern borders of Kenosha County; operated by the county
Mascoutin Valley State Trail,  between Ripon and Berlin.  operated by Fond du Lac, Green Lake County and Winnebago County
Mound View State Trail,  between Belmont and Platteville
Mountain-Bay State Trail,  between Wausau and Green Bay.  operated by Marathon, Shawano and Brown Counties
Newton Blackmour State Trail,  between Seymour and New London.  operated by Outagamie County.
Nicolet State Trail,  in northeastern Wisconsin; operated by Oconto County
Oak Leaf Trail,  of looping trails; in and operated by Milwaukee County
Oconto County Trail,  between Townsend and Gillett; operated by Oconto County 
Oconto River State Trail,  between Oconto and Stiles Junction; operated by Oconto County
Old Abe State Trail,  between Chippewa Falls and Cornell; operated by Chippewa County (website)
Old Plank Road Trail,  between Sheboygan and Greenbush (website)
Omaha Trail,  between Camp Douglas and Elroy; operated by Juneau County
Ozaukee Interurban Trail,  between Mequon and Belgium (website)
Pecatonica State Trail,  between Belmont and the Cheese Country Trail;  operated by Lafayette, Iowa and Green Counties (website)
Pine Line Trail,  between Medford to Prentice; operated by Taylor and Price Counties (website)
Saunders State Trail,  from the Gandy Dancer Trail into Minnesota(website)
Stower Seven Lakes State Trail,  between Amery and Dresser
Tomorrow River State Trail,  between Plover and Amherst;  operated by Portage County
Tri-County Corridor Trail,  between Superior to Ashland; operated by Ashland County, Bayfield County, and Douglas County
White River State Trail,  from Elkhorn and Burlington (website)
Wild Goose State Trail,  from Fond du Lac to Clyman Junction; operated by Fond du Lac County and Dodge County (website)
Wild Rivers State Trail, ; operated by Barron, Washburn, and Douglas Counties
Wiouwash State Trail,  from Oshkosh to Hortonville and Tigerton to Birnamwood; operated by Winnebago, Outagamie, Waupaca, and Shawano Counties (Outagamie website)
Wolf River State Trail,  between Crandon and White Lake

Municipally operated trails
Bugline Trail,  between Menomonee Falls and Merton (website)
Stevens Point Green Circle Trail,  around Stevens Point; operated by the city (website)

See also

List of bike trails in Wisconsin

References

External links

State Trails from the Wisconsin Department of Natural Resources
Hiking Trails from the Wisconsin Department of Tourism

 
Hiking trails
Wis